The British Rail Class 108 diesel multiple units were built by BR Derby from 1958 to 1961, with a final production quantity of 333 vehicles.

Overview

The 108 was formed as a 2-, 3-, or 4-car unit. Its aluminium body led the type to be classed as a lightweight unit. These units stayed in regular service until 1990, when they began to be withdrawn from traffic. They were replaced on regional services by the new Sprinter derivative units, or by Turbo units on services around London. The final units lasted in traffic until October 1993, although many saw further use in departmental service, as sandite or route-learner units. Good condition on withdrawal and lack of asbestos have ensured that many of this class are now used on preserved railway lines.

Orders

Accidents and incidents
On 19 October 1987, after the Glanrhyd Bridge over the River Towy at Llandeilo, Carmarthenshire, was washed away by floodwater, a passenger train operated by a Class 108 unit fell into the river. Four people were killed.
On 22 August 1990, a two-car Class 108 unit overran a signal and was in a head-on collision with a three-car unit majority-composed of Class 108 cars at Hyde Junction, Greater Manchester. Twenty-eight people were injured. The accident report noted the poor structural condition of the Class 108 vehicles compared to that of the Class 101 vehicle involved in the accident, and called for the 108 class to be withdrawn "as quickly as is practicable".

Preservation

Many vehicles have been preserved on heritage railways. None are currently certified for use on the main line – although the Swanage Railway's set was hauled from the railway to Eastleigh and back, for overhaul – and is believed to be the first class 108 to have been seen on main lines for a very long time.

References

General references
Motive Power Recognition: 3 DMUs. Colin J. Marsden
British Railway Pictorial: First Generation DMUs.  Kevin Robertson
British Rail Fleet Survey 8: Diesel Multiple Units- The First Generation.  Brian Haresnape
A Pictorial Record of British Railways Diesel Multiple Units.  Brian Golding

External links

Class 108 Derby 2,3 & 4-car DMUs - on Railcar.co.uk
Llangollen Railcar Group - owners of preserved DMUs on Llangollen Railway.
The Railcar Association
The DMU Group (West Midlands)

108
Train-related introductions in 1958